SWE may refer to:

 Sensor Web Enablement, an Open Geospatial Consortium framework for defining a Sensor Web
 Shallow water equations, a set of equations that describe flow below a pressure surface
 Snow water equivalent
 Society of Women Engineers, a non-profit engineering organization
 Society of Wood Engravers, a British printmakers' group
 Software engineer
 Staebler–Wronski effect, light-induced changes in the properties of silicon
 Sweden, the country's ISO 3166-1 alpha-3-code
 Swedish language, the language's ISO 639-2 and ISO 639-3 language code